Joura Assembly constituency is one of the 230 Vidhan Sabha (Legislative Assembly) constituencies of Madhya Pradesh state in central India. This constituency came into existence in 1951, as one of the 79 Vidhan Sabha constituencies of the erstwhile Madhya Bharat state.

Joura (constituency number 4) is one of the six Vidhan Sabha constituencies located in Morena district. This constituency covers parts of Joura and Kailaras.

Members of Legislative Assembly
As a constituency of Madhya Bharat:
 1951: Ram Chandra Mishra, Indian National Congress
As a constituency of Madhya Pradesh:
 1998: Soneram Kushwah, Bahujan Samaj Party
 2003: Ummed Singh Bana, Indian National Congress
 2008: maniram Kushwaha, Bahujan Samaj Party
 2013: Subedar Singh Rajodha, Bharatiya Janata Party
 2018: Banwari Lal Sharma jhapdhap, Indian National Congress

See also
 Joura

References

Morena district
Assembly constituencies of Madhya Pradesh